Zinaida Vladimirovna Stahurskaya (original name: Зинаида Владимировна Стагурская; also written as Zinaida Stagurskaya, Zinaida Stahurskaia or Zinaida Stagourskaya; 9 February 1971 – 25 June 2009) was a Belarusian racing cyclist who was the world champion in  2000. Stahurskaya was born in Vitebsk. She rode at the 1992 Summer Olympics for the Unified Team and at the 1996 Summer Olympics and the 2004 Summer Olympics for Belarus.

Doping
In 2006 Stahurskaya was banned for two years for a drugs test that she failed in 2005 at a number of European races. One positive test for the  anabolic steroid stanozolol at the GP Carnevale Europa and twice for the hormone testosterone at the Giro di San Marino and Sparkassen Giro Bochum.

Stahurskaya had earlier been suspended for a positive test for a banned diuretic at the 2001 Giro d'Italia Femminile and a positive test for ephedrine at the 2003 Circuito di Massarosa. She was subsequently banned for four months and for two months respectively.

Death
Stahurskaya died in 2009 after being struck by a car while training.

Major results

1994
1st  Overall Tour de Feminin-O cenu Českého Švýcarska
1st  Overall GP Presov & Pravda
1st Stage 4 Essen Etappenfahrt
1st Stage 7 Tour du Finistère

1999
1st Stage 3 Giro d'Italia Femminile
2nd Tjejtrampet
6th Trofeo Alfredo Binda - Comune di Cittiglio

2000 
1st UCI Road World Championships Road Race
1st  Overall Giro della Toscana
1st Stage 11 Giro d'Italia Femminile

2001 
1st  Overall Giro del Trentino Alto Adige - Südtirol
1st Stages 2a, 4 & 9 Giro d'Italia Femminile
2nd Overall Giro della Toscana
2nd Overall Tour de Snowy
2nd GP Carnevale d'Europa

2002 
2nd Overall Giro d'Italia Femminile
1st Stages 2 & 8
2nd Overall Giro della Toscana
1st Stage 2
2rd Trofeo Alfredo Binda - Comune di Cittiglio
3rd Overall Emakumeen Bira
3rd Overall Giro del Trentino Alto Adige - Südtirol

2003
1st Trofeo Riviera Della Versilia
1st Stage 2 Giro d'Italia Femminile

2004 
2nd Overall Giro del Trentino Alto Adige - Südtirol
1st Stages 2 & 4

2005 
1st  Overall Tour Féminin en Limousin
1st Stages 1, 3 & 4
1st  Overall Giro di San Marino
1st Stage 2
1st Cento
1st GP Città di Castenaso
3rd Trofeo Riviera Della Versilia

2008 
2nd National Road Race Championships

References

External links 

1971 births
2009 deaths
Belarusian female cyclists
Sportspeople from Vitebsk
Cyclists at the 1992 Summer Olympics
Cyclists at the 1996 Summer Olympics
Cyclists at the 2004 Summer Olympics
Olympic cyclists of Belarus
Olympic cyclists of the Unified Team
Road incident deaths in Belarus
UCI Road World Champions (women)